Viplaix is a commune in the Allier department in Auvergne-Rhône-Alpes in central France.

Population

See also
Communes of the Allier department

References

Communes of Allier
Allier communes articles needing translation from French Wikipedia